Buwenge General Hospital, also Buwenge Hospital, is a hospital under construction in the Eastern Region of Uganda.

Location
Buwenge General Hospital would be located in the town of Buwenge, in Magamaga Parish, in Buwenge sub-county, Kagoma county, in Jinja District.

Overview
As far back as 2008, the Jinja District Administration began preparation for the construction of a general hospital in the district, with funds sourced from the government of China.

In 2013, the government of Uganda, borrowed US$195 million from the World Bank to construct, renovate and equip certain hospitals and health centers, including Buwenge General Hospital. The specific items to be constructed at the hospital include: 

 Construction of new buildings consisting of a double-storied T-Block to house patient wards 
 Build a new, larger, outpatient department
 Build an emergency department (casualty department)
 Build a hospital administration block
 Build a house to accommodate the diesel generator for electricity
 Build a placenta disposal facility
 Build a bio-medical waste disposal facility 
 Build six new staff residences
 Build a laundry facility for patients' families
 Build a kitchen and dining room for patients' families
 Build ventilated, improved, pit latrines for patients' families and outpatients.

See also
 List of hospitals in Uganda

References

External links
 Jinja District Information Portal
 Website of Uganda Ministry of Health

Hospitals in Uganda
Jinja District
Busoga
Eastern Region, Uganda